Provident Entertainment is a division of Sony Music headquartered in Franklin, Tennessee and focused primarily on Christian music. The group handles its own physical distribution through its Provident-Integrity service.

Provident Label Group 
 Current labels
 Essential Records
 Flicker Records
 iShine Records
 Reunion Records
 Beach Street Records
 Praise Hymn Soundtracks

 Former labels
 Brentwood Records
 Benson Records
 Fervent Records
 Diadem Music Group
 Provident Special Markets

Provident-Integrity distribution 
In addition to its own labels, the distribution arm of Provident provides Christian-market distribution to these labels:

 7Spin Music
 Arista Records
 BMG Classics (now Sony Masterworks)
 Boneyard Records (official label of T-Bone (rapper))
 Comin Atcha Distribution
 Creative Trust Workshop
 Cross Movement Records
 Galilee of the Nations
 GospoCentric Records/B-Rite Music
 Gray Matters
 INO Records
 Integrity Gospel
 Integrity Media
 New Haven Records
 RCA Records/RCA Inspiration
 Save the City Records
 Track Star Records
 Verity Records
 Wind-up Records

Provident Films 
Provident Films is a division of Provident Entertainment. They have promoted notable films like Facing the Giants and Ring the Bell.

See also 
 Sony Music Entertainment
 List of Record Labels
 Christian Record Labels

References

External links 
 

Sony Music
Companies based in Franklin, Tennessee
1997 establishments in Tennessee
Record labels established in 1997